Craig is a Scottish, Irish and Welsh masculine given name, all variations derive from the same Celtic branch. The name has two origins. In some cases it can originate from a nickname, derived from the Scottish Gaelic word creag, meaning "rock," similar to Peter. In other cases, the given name originates from the Scottish surname Craig, which is also derived from the same Scottish Gaelic word. Cognate forms of creag include the Irish creig, Manx creg, and Welsh craig. The English word "crag" also shares an origin with these Celtic words. The given name Craig is popular in Scotland, and is used throughout the English speaking world.

In North America it is often pronounced with a short vowel sound , as in "egg", while the British pronunciation sounds the diphthong .

Notable people with the given name
Craig Adams (disambiguation), several people
Craig Ackerman (born 1974), American basketball announcer
Craig Albernaz (born 1982), American baseball coach
Craig Alcock (born 1987), English professional footballer
Craig Anton (born 1962), American actor
Craig Bartlett, (born 1956), American animator
Craig Bellamy (born 1979), Welsh footballer
Craig Biggio (born 1965), American baseball player
Craig Breedlove (born 1937), American racing driver
Craig Breslow (born 1980), American baseball player
Craig Brown (footballer, born 1940), former coach of the Scotland national football team
Craig Brown (satirist) (born 1957), English writer and humorist
Craig Challen, Australian technical diver and cave explorer
Craig Chaquico (born 1954), American guitarist
Craig Charles (born 1964), British actor
Craig Claiborne (1920–2000), American restaurant critic, food journalist and book author
Craig Cohn (born 1983), American professional wrestler
Craig Considine (academic) (born 1986) Christian and American scholar of Islam
Craig B. Cooper (born 1949), American aquanaut
Craig Cotton (born 1980), American football player
Craig Curry (born 1961), American football player
Craig David (born 1981), English singer-songwriter
Craig Davidson (born 1976), Canadian author
Craig Dawson (born 1990), English footballer
Craig Disley (born 1981), English professional footballer
Craig Douglas (born 1941), British singer
Craig Doyle (born 1970), Irish TV and radio presenter
Craig Dudley (born 1979), English footballer
Craig Engels (born 1994), American middle-distance runner
Craig Esherick (born 1956), American professor
Craig Fairbrass (born 1964), English actor
Craig Ferguson (born 1962), Scottish-American comedian, succeeded Craig Kilborn as host of CBS' The Late Late Show
Craig Flournoy (born 1951), American journalist
Craig Fortnam (born 1967), English musician and conductor
Craig Foster (disambiguation), several people
Craig Frost (born 1948), American keyboardist
Craig Gannon (born 1966), English guitarist
Craig Gardner (born 1986), English professional footballer
Craig Gass (born 1970), American actor
Craig Gazey (born 1982), British actor
Craig Gilchrist (born 1970), South African basketball coach and former player
Craig Gilroy (born 1991), Irish rugby player
Craig Greenberg (born 1973), American businessman, lawyer, and politician
Craig Hooper (born 1959), Australian musician
Craig Taro Gold (born 1969), American author and entrepreneur
Craig Goldman (born 1968), American politician
Craig Gordon (born 1982), Scottish footballer
Craig Hertwig (1952–2012), American football player
Craig Hinton (1964–2006), British writer
Craig Horner (born 1983), Australian actor
Craig Hutchison (swimmer) (born 1975), Canadian freestyle swimmer
Craig James (disambiguation), multiple people
Craig Jones (disambiguation), several people
Craig Joubert (born 1977), South African rugby player
Craig Juntunen (born 1954), American-Canadian football player
Craig Kallman, chairman and CEO of Atlantic Records
Craig Keith (born 1971), American football player
Craig Kilborn, American talk show host, preceded Craig Ferguson as host of CBS' The Late Late Show
Craig Kieswetter (born 1987), English cricketer
Craig Kimbrel (born 1988), American baseball player
Craig Kyle (born 1971), American writer
Craig Larman (born 1958), Canadian computer scientist
Craig Laundy (born 1971), former Australian politician
Craig Levein (born 1964), Scottish football coach
Craig Liddle (born 1971), former English footballer
Craig Low (born 1985), Australian comedian
Craig Lowndes (born 1974), Australian racing driver
Craig Mabbitt (born 1987), American singer-songwriter
Craig Mack (1970–2018), American rapper
Craig MacLean (born 1971), Scottish cyclist
Craig McCracken (born 1971), American cartoonist
Craig McKinley (disambiguation), several people
Craig McLachlan, (born 1965) Australian actor and musician
Craig MacTavish, (born 1958) American hockey player
Craig Melchert, (born 1945) American linguist
Craig Menear (born c. 1958), American business executive
Craig Morgan (born 1964), American country singer
Craig Murray (born 1958), former British Ambassador to Uzbekistan
Craig Nicholls (born 1977), Australian musician and frontman of The Vines
Craig T. Nelson (born 1944), American actor
Craig Newmark (born 1952), American founder of the online classified site Craigslist
Craig Oliver (disambiguation)
Craig Oliver (media executive) (born 1969), Downing Street Director of Communications and former BBC media executive
Craig Pattison (born 1971), Canadian Rock musician
Craig Pittman (born 1959), former American wrestler
Craig Puki (born 1957), American football player
Craig Reucassel (born 1976), Australian radio and television presenter
Craig Revel Horwood (born 1965), Australian-British dancer and choreographer
Craig Rice (author) (1908-1957), American author
Craig Roberts (disambiguation), several people
Craig Robinson (actor) (born 1971), American actor and stand-up comedian
Craig Rodwell (1940-1993), American gay rights activist and founder of the first gay bookstore
Craig Reynolds (disambiguation), several people
Craig Russell (disambiguation), several people
Craig Sheffer (born 1960), American actor
Craig Stevens (disambiguation), several people
Craig Stott (born 1990), Australian actor
Craig Taborn (born 1970), American musician
Craig Thompson (born 1975), American cartoonist
Craig Unger (born 1949), American journalist and writer
Craig Venter (born 1946), American biologist
Craig Washington (born 1941), former United States Congressman
Craig Wasson (born 1954), American actor
Craig Waters (born 1956), American lawyer and court spokesperson
Craig Williamson (born 1946), South African policeman and spy
Craig Zimmerman (born 1974), American actor
Craig Zonca (born 1984), Australian radio and television presenter
Craig Zucker (born 1975), American politician

Fictional characters
Craig Cody, a character in the movie and TV series of Animal Kingdom
Craig Dean, a character in Hollyoaks
Craig Dixon (EastEnders), short-lived EastEnders character
Craig Feldspar, a recurring character in Malcolm in the Middle, portrayed by David Anthony Higgins
Craig Gilner, the main character of It's Kind of a Funny Story
Craig Manning, a character in Degrassi: The Next Generation
Craig Marduk, a character in Tekken 4
Craig Owens, a character in the Doctor Who episodes The Lodger and Closing Time
Craig Ramirez, a character in the Nickelodeon sitcom Drake & Josh
Craig Tucker, a recurring South Park character
Craig Williams, the main character of Craig of the Creek
Dean Craig Pelton a recurring character on Community (TV Series)
Craig, Sanjay's pet snake from Sanjay and Craig

References

See also
List of Irish-language given names
List of Scottish Gaelic given names

English masculine given names
English-language masculine given names
Scottish masculine given names